The Norbert Wiener Award for Social and Professional Responsibility was established in 1987 in honor of Norbert Wiener to recognize contributions by computer professionals to socially responsible use of computers. It was awarded annually by CPSR, Computer Professionals for Social Responsibility, until that organization disbanded in 2013. The award is now managed by the IEEE Society for the Social Implications of Technology.

Winners 
 1987: David Parnas
 1988: Joseph Weizenbaum
 1989: Daniel McCracken
 1990: Kristen Nygaard
 1991: Severo Ornstein and Laura Gould
 1992: Barbara Simons
 1993: Institute for Global Communications
 1994: Antonia Stone
 1995: Tom Grundner
 1996: Phil Zimmermann
 1997: Peter Neumann
 1998: Internet Engineering Task Force
 1999: The Free Software & Open Source Movements
 2000: Marc Rotenberg
 2001: Nira Schwartz and Theodore Postol
 2002: Karl Auerbach
 2003: Mitch Kapor
 2004: Barry Steinhardt
 2005: Douglas Engelbart
 2008: Bruce Schneier
 2013:  Gary Chapman

See also
 Norbert Wiener Prize in Applied Mathematics
 List of computer-related awards
 Prizes named after people

External links 
 
 List of winners
 Speech introducing the award
 Documentary film about Norbert Wiener Award winner, Joseph Weizenbaum  ( "Weizenbaum. Rebel at Work." ) 
 IEEE Society for the Social Implications of Technology

Awards established in 1987
Computer-related awards

ja:社会的責任を考えるコンピュータ専門家の会#ノーバート・ウィーナー賞